This is a list of newspapers published in Taiwan. 

After Apple Daily ceased print publication in 2021, there are currently three major daily newspapers: the Liberty Times (自由時報), United Daily News (聯合報), and China Times (中國時報). In addition, there are two major business-focused, financial newspapers: the Commercial Times (工商時報) and Economic Daily News (經濟日報).

After competitors Taiwan News ceased print publication in 2010 and The China Post in 2015, Taipei Times (英文台北時報) remains the only major English-language newspaper in Taiwan.

Corporate media

Major Chinese-language newspapers 
{| class="sortable wikitable"
! Name
! Chinese Names
! Owner
! Established
! Circulation
! Editorial stance
! Party support in 2020 presidential election

|-
|Liberty Times||
|Liberty Times Group || 1980 || 529,178 || Liberal, pro-DPP, supports Taiwan independence, anti-China, friendly to Japan|| Democratic Progressive Party 
|-
|United Daily News||
|United Daily News Group ||1951 ||210,000 ||Conservative, pro-KMT, supports friendly cross-strait relations|| Kuomintang 
|-
|China Times||
|Want Want China Times Group || 1950||135,000|| Conservative, pro-KMT, pro-China, supports friendly cross-strait relations ||Kuomintang
|}

Commercial Times: established in 1978, part of Want Want China Times media group
Economic Daily News: established in 1967, part of United Daily News group

English-language newspaper 
Taipei Times: established in 1999, part of Liberty Times Group

Competitors Taiwan News ceased print publication in 2010 and The China Post in 2015.

Government-owned media

Chinese news media 
 Central News Agency – National news agency of  Taiwan (Republic of China)
 Kinmen Daily News – in Kinmen, operated by Kinmen County Government.
 Matsu Daily – in Matsu Islands, operated by Lienchiang County Government.
 Youth Daily News – operated by the Ministry of National Defense

English news media 
 Focus Taiwan – operated by the Central News Agency (Taiwan)

Other newspapers 
 China Daily News – in Tainan (Southern Taiwan)
 Mandarin Daily News – a children-facing news paper, all Traditional Chinese characters are annotated with Mandarin Phonetic Symbols.
 The Epoch Times
 Taiwan Times – in Kaohsiung (Southern Taiwan)

Online newspapers 
 Apple Daily – Major daily newspaper which ended print publication in 2021 and switched to all-digital format
 Central Daily News – operated by Kuomintang, a political party, began operations from 1945 in Taiwan, ceased print publication in 2006
 Independence Evening Post – printed newspaper until 2001
 The China Post – former English-language newspaper, ended its print publication in 2017 and switched to all-digital format
 Taiwan Daily – print publication ended in June 2006
 Taiwan News – former English-language newspaper, ended print publication in 2015 and switched to all-digital format

Defunct newspapers 
 China Times Express – in the same group as China Times,  published between 1988 and 2005
 Min Sheng Bao
 United Evening News – in the same group as United Daily News, ceased publication in 2020

See also 
 Media of Taiwan
 Television in Taiwan
 National Communications Commission
 Central News Agency (Taiwan)

External links
 Taiwan News  English version
 Taiwan News  Chinese version
 The News Lens international edition

References

Taiwan
Taiwan
Lists of mass media in Taiwan
 

Newspapers